Ankola is a Town Municipal Council and a taluka in Uttara Kannada district of the Indian state of Karnataka. The name of the place is derived from a forest shrub Ankola grown on the coastal hill side and worshiped by the Halakki Vokkaligas as a totem.

Ankola is a small town surrounded by temples, schools, paddy fields and mango groves. It is located on the coast of the Arabian sea and has natural beaches. Ankola is known for its native breed of Mango called kari Ishaad as wells as its cashews. Vaidya Late Shivu Bommu Gouda Memorial Hospital is known for the treatment of paralysis.

Geography
The Gangavali River (also known as Bedti) is a prominent river that flows near the town.

Belekeri is a natural port located nearby which is mainly used to ship iron ore to China and Europe.

Demographics

 India census, Total population of Ankola Taluk is 101,549 living in 21,079 Houses, Spread across a total 309 villages and 20 panchayats . Males are 51,398 and Females are 50,151 . Ankola Town Panchayat has a population of 22,249 of which 11,034 are males while 11,215 are females as per report released by Census of India 2011.

Population of Children with age of 0-6 is 2025 which is 9.10% of total population of Ankola (TP + OG). In Ankola Town Panchayat, Female Sex Ratio is of 1016 against state average of 973. Moreover, the child sex ratio in Ankola is around 1013 compared to Karnataka state average of 948. Literacy rate of Ankola city is 90.63%, higher than the state average of 75.36%. In Ankola, male literacy is around 94.63% while female literacy rate is 86.69%.

Ankola Town Panchayat has a total administration over 5,271 houses, to which it supplies basic amenities like water and sewerage. It is also authorized to build roads within Town Panchayat limits and impose taxes on properties coming under its jurisdiction.

Ankola's population includes diverse communities. The main language spoken is Kannada with Konkani having a sizeable population in the taluk. Among the Muslims, Urdu is common.

Villages of Ankola
Villages of Ankola include:

 Achave
 Adigon
 Adlur
 Agragon (Agragone)
 Agsur
 Algeri (Alageri)
 Andle
 Aversa
 Balale Bandar
 Baleguli Bela
 Basgod
 Belambar
 Belekeri
 Belse
 Bhavikeri (Bavikeri)
 Bidrager
 Bilehoingi
 Bobruwada
 Bogribail
 Bole
 Brahmur
 Devigadde
 Dongri
 Devarbhavi
 Gundabala
 Halvalli
 Harwada (Harvada)
 Hattikeri
 Honnekeri
 Padmapur Heggar
 Makkigadde
 Honnebail
 Heggarnikotebavi
 Hichkad
 Hillur
 Hittalamakki
 Hoskeri
 Joog
 Jamgod
 Kabgal
 Kakaramath
 Kalbhag
 Kanasigadde
 Kalleshwar
 Kammani
 Kanagil (Kangil)
 Kanthri
 Keni
 Kendige
 Kenkanishivapur
 Kogre
 Kodlagadde
 Kumbarakeri
 Kuntgani
 Lakkeguli
 Laxmeshwar
 Manigadde
 Manjaguni
 Matakeri
 Mogta
 Moralli
 Nadibag
 Navagadde
 Nellurkanchinbail
 Poojgeri
 Sagadgeri
 Shetageri
 Sheveguli
 Shikliturli
 Shinganmakki
 Shirgunji
 Shirur
 Sunksal
 Surve (Soorve)
 Talebail
 Takatgeri
 Torke
 Tenkankeri
 Ulware
 Vaidya Heggar
 Vandige
 Varilbena
 Vasar Kudrige
 Wadibogri
 Konki
 Kaigadi
 Shavakar
 Pallikeri
 Amber hithla
 Gangavali
 Nadu Maskeri

Salt Satyagraha

In 1930, after the success of Mahatma Gandhi's Salt Satyagraha, Karnataka decided to conduct its own. On 13 April, in the presence of about 40,000 people M.P. Nadakarni broke the salt law in Ankola. The Nadavara Community collectively plunged into the heroic prowess of India's freedom struggle. Revu Honnappa Nayak, Honnappa Mangeshkar bought the first packet of salt auctioned for 30 rupees. After the auction Swami Vidyananda addressed the gathering in which leaders like Karnad Sadashiva Rao.

Karabandi Dictator॥ Basagoda Rama Nayak , Smt Umabai Kundapur, Dr Hardikar, T.S. Naikand others participated. The police promptly arrested the leaders, but the Sathyagraha continued for 45 days. Salt Sathyagraha was offered in nearly 30 centres like Mangalore, Kundapur, Udupi, Puttur, Padubidre, etc. in Karnataka. Students came out in large numbers to prepare salt and sell it from house to house. When Gandhiji decided to raid the salt depot at Dharsana, a similar raid was undertaken in Karnataka at Sanikatte. A group of volunteers led by Sridhar Panduranga Balaji collected a few maunds of salt and carried it to Kumta, where the whole stock was sold in 15 minutes.

Four taluks in Karnataka namely Hirekerur in Dharwad district and Ankola, Sirsi and Siddapura in North Kanara district were selected for organizing the no-tax campaign. Despite repressive measures by the authorities, the campaign was a huge success. More than 1500 activists were arrested in Karnataka for participating in the Civil-Disobedience Movement from 1930 to 1931. These historic events led to Ankola being named the "Bardoli of Karnataka".

Beaches
Ankola lies on the coast of the Arabian Sea and has many beaches, such as: Belekeri Beach, Nadibag Beach, Belambar Beach, Shedikulli Beach, Gabitkeni Beach, Honne gudi Beach ( from Ankola), Honey Beach, and Keni Beach.

Culture

Folk Dance

A popular folk dance in Ankola is Yakshagana.

Suggi kunitha a local seasonal folk dance, has begun in the coastal taluks of Uttara Kannada district. The troupes of the Suggi dancers move from one village to another during the paddy harvest season till the festival of "Holi" to perform the dance as a gratitude to the God for the successful harvest.

The Suggi dancers wear traditional dresses and headgears. The dance has historical background as it was used to create awareness among the masses against the British rule during the Independence movement.

Festivals

An annual mela called Bandihabba is celebrated on Buddha Poornima in the month of May. This is an important festival to be celebrated for nine days. On the ninth day, Mela is conducted near Shantadurga temple and people from around the town and village throng the temple and celebrate it.

Another festival called 'Karthik' is celebrated during November when five temple deities will be out of Ankola town on Palakki for a night stay and will return next morning. 

The Dahikaala (ದಹಿಕಾಲ) festival in Ankola as in Dahi Handi of Maharashtra celebrates the playful and mischievous side of Krishna, where teams of young men form human pyramids to reach a high-hanging pot of butter and break it. This festival is very much important to the Namadharis of Ankola in particular and the teams usually are of Namadhari youth by tradition.

Temples

Ankola houses many temples such as Honna Raka Temple, Mahamaya, Venkataramana Temple, and Shantadurga (known as Bhumidevathe), Shree Varamahaganapati Temple Shetgeri, Eeshwara devasthana. Migrated Konkani Saraswats are said to have brought with their Kuladevtas with them. Considering this to be their safe haven, they are said to have established the Kuladevata temples in Ankola. Some of the migrated Goan Deities are Lakshmi Narayan Mahamaya(Nagve Mahmamaya) from the Nagve village in Salcette Goa, Kundodari Mahamaya (Kudteri Mahamaya) from Curtorim in Salcette Goa, and the Aryadurga temple from the Anjediva (Aryadweep) island of Goa. The Shantadurga temple is assumed to be the gram devta of the village is still a question of debate, since many saraswat families do consider it to be their Kuladevta, but the locals state that the deity present is not of Konkani or Goan origin but currently a Dravidian deity.

Cuisine

Usual diet contains boiled white rice (called Kuchige akki) and fish, basale soppina hulaga in Kannada language (a vegetable sambar) & Koli Asi (chicken curry). Fish is consumed by a large part of population. Kajmiji is a local sweet.

Transportation 
Public road transportation to Ankola is handled by NWKRTC (North West Karnataka Road Transport Corporation )  .Road transportation is a crucial link for the population. Other modes of transportation such as inland water navigation, are also in use.

By roads and railways
It is well connected to Mangalore and Goa  by bus and train. Rail services are fairly regular.
Ankola is connected to Bangalore  by road. The National Highway 17( NH17 now NH66) passes through Ankola.

 Eastern direction - Connected to Hubli, Hyderabad by National Highway 63.
 Northern direction - Connected to Karwar, Goa by Road and railways.
 Southern direction - Connected to Gokarna, Murdeshwara, Udupi and Mangalore by Road and railways.
 Western direction:Arabian Sea & Beaches.

The rivers offer inland water navigation, usually in traditional ferries or mechanised boats. Hubli to Ankola railway facility has been pushed to backburner, due to the stay order from Supreme Court of India.

Nearest Airports
 Goa International Airport
 Mangalore International Airport 
 Kempegowda International Airport
 Belgaum Airport
 Hubli Airport
 Karwar Airport

Ports
 Belekeri Port

Education
The city and the taluk has a number of government, government aided and private educational institutions. Nirmala Hridaya, PMHS, Jaycee school, Shri Manjunath Swamy High school, Jai Hind Highschool, KLE's (Karnataka Lingayat Education) institutions, Governments Schools and colleges are some of the known educational institutions of Ankola. Gokhale Centenary College offers various pregraduate, undergraduate and also limited postgraduate courses. In 2007, Government First Grade College was started in Poojageri ( from Ankola) with a whopping student strength. This college offers bachelor's degree in arts, science, commerce and business administration. Ankola taluk also has seen an increasing number of Preuniversity colleges being established in the recent years. The rural areas generally have primary and highschool facilities.

Geographical orientation from Ankola

References

External links

Cities and towns in Uttara Kannada district